Hong Sehwa is a South Korean journalist and former New Progressive Party delegate.

Critical of anti-Japanese sentiment 
Hong Se-hwa is critical of South Korean liberals and progressives' anti-Japanese nationalism. He said anti-Japanese nationalism prevents liberals from growing socialist forces in the South, using radical rhetoric. He thinks neither Japanese conservative-nationalists nor South Korean liberal-nationalists speak for working class.

See also 
 Pak Noja

References

External links 
 Hong Sehwa's website 
  
  

1947 births
Living people
People from Seoul
The Hankyoreh
New Progressive Party (South Korea) politicians
Labor Party (South Korea) politicians
Anti-nationalism in Korea
South Korean progressives
South Korean socialists
South Korean left-wing activists